is a Japanese entrepreneur and venture capitalist. He is a former director of the MIT Media Lab, former professor of the practice of media arts and sciences at MIT, and a former visiting professor of practice at the Harvard Law School. Ito has received recognition for his role as an entrepreneur focused on Internet and technology companies and has founded, among other companies, PSINet Japan, Digital Garage, and Infoseek Japan. Ito is a strategic advisor to Sony Corporation and general partner of Neoteny Labs. Ito wrote a monthly column in the Ideas section of Wired.

Following the exposure of his personal and professional financial ties to sex offender and financier Jeffrey Epstein, Ito resigned from his roles at MIT, Harvard, the John D. and Catherine T. MacArthur Foundation, the Knight Foundation, PureTech Health, and The New York Times Company on September 7, 2019.

Early life and education

Ito was born in Kyoto, Japan. His family moved to Canada and then to the United States, when Ito was about three, to a suburb of Detroit, Michigan, where his father became a research scientist and his mother a secretary for Energy Conversion Devices, Inc., now Ovonics. The founder of his mother's company, Stanford R. Ovshinsky, was impressed with young Ito, whom he thought of almost as his son. Ovshinsky mentored the boy's interests in technology and social movements, and when Ito was 13, gave him work with scientists, saying, "He was not a child in the conventional sense."

Ito and his sister Mizuko Ito, called Mimi, spent summers in Japan with their grandmother, who taught them about traditional Japanese culture. At age 14, he returned to Japan, when his mother was promoted to president of Energy Conversion Devices Japan. He studied at the Nishimachi International School and, for high school, the American School in Japan in Tokyo. In that phase of his life, Ito also learned "street language, street smarts, and computers." One of the few Japanese using modems before networking deregulation reached Japan, in 1985, Ito had found The Source and the original MUD by his teens (and by 26, was working on his own MUD).

Ito returned to the United States to attend Tufts University as a computer science major, where he met, among others, Pierre Omidyar, later founder of eBay. As he deemed his course work too rigid and believed that learning computer science in school was "stupid," Ito dropped out of Tufts to work briefly for Ovonics. Ovshinsky encouraged him to return to school. Ito enrolled at the University of Chicago in physics but later dropped out as the program was overly oriented towards producing practical engineers rather than teaching an intuitive understanding of physics. In the fall of 1985, Ito became the first student to register for a pioneering program of online courses, offered by Connected Education, Inc., for undergraduate credit from The New School for Social Research. Ito also attended Hitotsubashi University, according to his essay in Japanese.

From Keio University, Ito earned a PhD in Media and Governance in 2018. His dissertation was titled The Practice of Change.

Ito is one of Timothy Leary's godsons—a close, nontraditional familial relationship that Leary reportedly developed for a few of his friends' children. Ito's sister, Mizuko Ito, is a cultural anthropologist, studying media technology use, and the musician Cornelius is his second cousin. Ito currently lives in Cambridge, Massachusetts, with his wife Mizuka Ito (née Kurogane). Joi and Mizuka's daughter, Kio (輝生), was born on May 11, 2017.

Career
Ito became a disc jockey working in nightclubs in Chicago such as the Limelight and Smart Bar, also working with Metasystems Design Group to start a virtual community in Tokyo. Later, Ito ran a nightclub in Roppongi, Japan, called XY Relax, with help from Joe Shanahan of Metro Chicago/Smart Bar. He helped bring industrial music from Chicago (Wax Trax) and later the rave scene, managing a DJ team and visual artists, including importing Anarchic Adjustment to Japan.

Ito was the Chairman of Creative Commons from December 2006 until 2012. He is on the board of Digital Garage, Culture Convenience Club (CCC), Tucows, and EPIC, and is on the advisory boards of Creative Commons and WITNESS. He is the founder and CEO of the venture capital firm Neoteny Co., Ltd. In October 2004, he was named to the board of ICANN for a three-year term starting December 2004. In August 2005, he joined the board of the Mozilla Foundation and served until April 2016. He served on the board of the Open Source Initiative (OSI) from March 2005 until April 2007.  He was a founding board member of Expression College for Digital Arts as well as the Zero One Art and Technology Network. In 1999, he served as the Associate to Mr. Mount (the executive producer) on the film The Indian Runner. Ito also served as a board member of Energy Conversion Devices from 1995 to 2000.

Ito is a venture capitalist and angel investor and was an early stage investor in Kickstarter, Twitter, Six Apart, Technorati, Flickr, Wikia, SocialText, Dopplr, Last.fm, Rupture, Kongregate, Fotopedia, Diffbot, Formlabs, 3Dsolve and other Internet companies. A vocal advocate of emergent democracy and the sharing economy, Ito is a doctoral candidate in Business Administration focusing on the sharing economy at the Graduate School of International Corporate Strategy, Hitotsubashi University. He is the author of Emergent Democracy. Ito is Senior Visiting Researcher of Keio Research Institute at SFC. In May 2011, it was announced that Ito's company, Digital Garage, will provide PR, marketing, product marketing research and market research for LinkedIn Japan.

Ito is a PADI IDC Staff Instructor, an Emergency First Responder Instructor Trainer, and a Divers Alert Network (DAN) Instructor Trainer.

In recent years, Ito has become critical of what he sees as Japan's inward focus. He stated in a 2011 interview that he thinks Japan needs to look internationally if it is to continue to be "relevant".

Journalism
Ito has written op-eds for the Asian Wall Street Journal and The New York Times and has published articles in numerous other magazines and newspapers. He has written regular columns in The Daily Yomiuri, Mac World Japan, Asahi Pasocom, Asahi Doors, and other media sources. His photographs have been used in The New York Times Online, BusinessWeek, American Heritage, Wired News, Forbes, and BBC News. He was on the early editorial mastheads of Wired and Mondo 2000. He has authored and co-authored a number of books including Dialog – Ryu Murakami X Joichi Ito with Ryu Murakami, and "Freesouls: Captured and Released" with Christopher Adams, a book of Ito's photographs that includes essays by several prominent figures in the free culture movement. He has hosted televisions shows including The New Breed and SimTV shows on NHK.

He is currently the host of a TV show called "Super-Presentation" airing weekly in Japan on NHK.

Recognition and honors
Ito was listed by Time magazine as a member of the "Cyber-Elite" in 1997. He was also named one of the 50 "Stars of Asia" in the "Entrepreneurs and Dealmakers" category by BusinessWeek and commended by the Japanese Ministry of Posts and Telecommunications for supporting the advancement of IT in 2000. He was selected by the World Economic Forum in 2001 as one of the "Global Leaders for Tomorrow" and chosen by Newsweek as a member of the "Leaders of The Pack (high technology industry)" in 2005, and listed by Vanity Fair as a member of "The Next Establishment" in the October Issue, 2007 and 2011. Ito was named by BusinessWeek as one of the 25 Most Influential People on the Web in 2008. On July 22, 2011 he was awarded a Lifetime Achievement Award in recognition of his role as one of the world's leading advocates of Internet freedom from the University of Oxford Internet Institute. In 2011, with Ethan Zuckerman, he was named by Foreign Policy magazine to its list of top global thinkers, in which he stated the Best idea is "Users controlling their own data". Ito received the degree of Doctor of Literature, honoris causa, from The New School in 2013. On March 11, 2014, Ito was inducted into the SXSW Interactive Festival Hall of Fame. He was a TED speaker at the March 21, TED2014. In 2014, Ito was awarded the Golden Plate Award by the Academy of Achievement. On May 17, 2015 Ito received a Doctor of Humane Letters, honoris causa, from Tufts University. Ito was elected to the American Academy of Arts and Sciences in April 2017. On May 11, 2017 Ito was awarded the IRI Medal.

MIT Media Lab (2011–2019)
In April 2011, Ito was named the director of the MIT Media Lab; he began in this role on September 1, 2011. His appointment was called an "unusual choice" since Ito studied at two colleges, but did not finish his degrees. "The choice is radical, but brilliant," said Larry Smarr, director of Calit2. He was professor of the practice of media arts and sciences at MIT beginning in 2016.

Nicholas Negroponte, Media Lab's co-founder and chairman emeritus, described the choice as bringing the media to "Joi's world". In an interview with Asian Scientist Magazine, Ito discussed his vision for the MIT Media Lab, and how he liked the word “learning” better than the word “education”.

As part of his work at the Media Lab, Ito was a part of the emerging dialogue around the ethics and governance of Artificial Intelligence, teaching a course on the topic with professor Jonathan Zittrain and co-founding the Council on Extended Intelligence with the Institute of Electrical and Electronics Engineers (IEEE).

In August 2021, Ito was appointed as the Digital Auditor, the top administrative official of Japan's Digital Agency. However, many people raised concerns about his appointment, because of his relationship with Jeffrey Epstein. In September, after the Digital Agency was established, Ito was appointed as one of the members of the Digital Society Initiative Council, a panel of experts.

Departure from MIT (2019) 
In 2019, revelations of Ito's connections with Jeffrey Epstein, a convicted child sex offender, shed light on the extent of Epstein's monetary gifts to the Media Lab and to Ito's startups outside of MIT. Ito initially wrote an apology but refused to resign, which led to the departure of several prominent Media Lab members, including Ethan Zuckerman, director of the MIT's Center for Civic Media, and Media Lab visiting scholar J. Nathan Matias. Calls for Ito to resign were followed by a website (wesupportjoi.org) and letter in support of Ito which appeared in late August signed by more than 100 people including Lawrence Lessig, Hiroshi Ishii (computer_scientist), Stewart Brand, Nicholas Negroponte, Jonathan Zittrain, and George M. Church.  However, the website was taken down after further details emerged. Ito later admitted to taking $525,000 in funding from Epstein for the lab, and permitting Epstein to invest 1.2 million in Ito's personal investment funds.

Further revelations and leaked emails 
On September 6, 2019, an article by Ronan Farrow in The New Yorker alleged that the lab led by Ito had "a deeper fund-raising relationship with Epstein" than it had acknowledged, and that the lab attempted to conceal the extent of its contacts with him. The article, based on leaked emails between Epstein, Ito and others, alleged that "Ito and other lab employees took numerous steps to keep Epstein’s name from being associated with the donations he made or solicited," and that Ito specifically solicited individual donations from Epstein. The article further claimed that Epstein "appeared to serve as an intermediary between the lab and other wealthy donors, soliciting millions of dollars in donations from individuals and organizations" and that "Epstein was credited with securing at least $7.5 million in donations for the lab." Ito, in an email to The New York Times, said The New Yorker report was “full of factual errors.” According to Harvard Law School professor Lawrence Lessig the anonymity of the Jeffrey Epstein donations was to avoid "whitewashing" Epstein's reputation and not to conceal the relationship between Ito and Epstein.

The president of MIT requested an "immediate, thorough and independent" investigation into the "extremely serious" and "deeply disturbing allegations about the engagement between individuals at the Media Lab and Jeffrey Epstein."

Resignations
In September 2019, Ito resigned as director of the Media Lab and as an MIT professor shortly after The New Yorker article. The New York Times reported that Ito had resigned from his visiting professorship at Harvard University, in addition he relinquished a number of other roles on September 7 amid the controversy:

 Ito left the board of the John D. and Catherine T. MacArthur Foundation. The MacArthur Foundation wrote, "the recent reports of Ito's behavior in The New Yorker, if true, would not be in keeping with the values of MacArthur. Most importantly, our hearts go out to the girls and women who survived the abuse of Jeffrey Epstein."
 He resigned from the board of The New York Times Company following the Epstein revelations. The New York Times said "Our newsroom will continue its aggressive reporting on Mr. Epstein, investigating both the individuals and the broader systems of power that enabled him for so many years."
 Ito resigned from the board of trustees of the John S. and James L. Knight Foundation, who wrote, "Jeffrey Epstein’s crimes continue to reverberate, most painfully with the girls and women who were his victims. We extend our deepest sympathies to them."
 He resigned as the chairman of PureTech Health. The company said that “given circumstances related to the MIT Media Lab, we agreed that Joi’s resignation from PureTech was appropriate.”

Results of MIT investigation
On January 10, 2020, MIT released results of its fact-finding on engagements with Jeffrey Epstein.
The investigation was conducted by Goodwin Procter LLP whose partners were retained to "conduct investigation into both Epstein's donations and Epstein's other interactions with MIT."
The MIT Report found that "donations to MIT were driven either by former Media Lab Director Joi Ito or by Seth Lloyd, a professor of mechanical engineering and physics, not by MIT's central administration." However, the report also states that certain members of MIT's Senior Team "were aware of, and approved, Epstein's donations to support Ito and the Media Lab." Furthermore, the report found that "contrary to certain media reports, neither Epstein nor his foundations was ever coded as "disqualified" in MIT's donor systems. Further, the code "disqualified" does not mean that a person or entity is "blacklisted" or prohibited from donating to the institute. Rather, the term "disqualified" is a database code for any donor who previously donated to MIT but presently is dormant or is no longer interested in giving to MIT."
The report's executive summary ends with the finding that "since MIT had no policy or processes for handling controversial donors in place at the time, the decision to accept Epstein's post-conviction donations cannot be judged to be a policy violation. But it is clear that the decision was the result of collective and significant errors in judgment that resulted in serious damage to the MIT community."

Center for Radical Transformation at CIT (2021–)
In December 2021, Ito was appointed as the Director of the Center for Radical Transformation (CRT) at Chiba Institute of Technology, Japan. He also serves as a member of CIT's Board of Trustees.

Bibliography

See also
 History of the Japanese in Metro Detroit
 Free culture

References

External links

 Official webpage
 Official webpage 
 Book announcement for "Whiplash"
 
 
 
 Joichi Ito Interview Video
 Joichi Ito on the MikeyPod Podcast

1966 births
Living people
Academic scandals
American School in Japan alumni
Japanese activists
Japanese bloggers
Japanese chief executives
Japanese company founders
Japanese expatriates in the United States
Members of the Creative Commons board of directors
Members of the Open Source Initiative board of directors
MIT Media Lab people
Mozilla people
MUD developers
Open content activists
People from Kyoto
Technology company founders
Tufts University alumni
Tufts University School of Engineering alumni
Venture capitalists
Fellows of the American Academy of Arts and Sciences
Creative Commons-licensed authors
Massachusetts Institute of Technology people